Truesdale is a surname. Notable people with the surname include:
 C.W. "Bill" Truesdale, founder of New Rivers Press in the United States
 Calvin Truesdale, former Mayor of Rock Island, Illinois
 Donald Leroy Truesdale, a United States Marine Corps Medal of Honor recipient
 Frank Truesdale, an American baseball player
 John C. Truesdale, former chair of the National Labor Relations Board in the United States
 William Truesdale, an American railroad executive
 Yanic Truesdale, a Canadian actor